NA-176 may refer to:

NA-176 (Muzaffargarh-I), a former constituency of the National Assembly of Pakistan
NA-176 (Rahim Yar Khan-II), a constituency of the National Assembly of Pakistan